North Eastham is a census-designated place (CDP) in the town of Eastham in Barnstable County, Massachusetts, United States. The population was 1,806 at the 2010 census.

The main visitor center of the Cape Cod National Seashore is located in North Eastham.

Geography
North Eastham is located within the northwestern part of the Town of Eastham at  (41.851349, −69.999928). It is bordered to the west by Cape Cod Bay, to the north by the town of Wellfleet, to the east by U.S. Route 6 and Great Pond Road, and to the south by Great Pond, Herring Brook Road, and Samoset Road.

Demographics

At the 2000 census there were 1,915 people, 881 households, and 570 families in the CDP. The population density was 217.5/km (562.4/mi). There were 2,656 housing units at an average density of 301.6/km (780.1/mi).  The racial makeup of the CDP was 98.12% White, 0.26% African American, 0.16% Native American, 0.42% Asian, 0.05% Pacific Islander, 0.05% from other races, and 0.94% from two or more races. Hispanic or Latino of any race were 0.84%.

Education

Nauset Public Schools serves the community.

Nauset Regional High School is the area high school.

See also
French Cable Hut

References

External links
Provincetown Banner

Census-designated places in Barnstable County, Massachusetts
Eastham, Massachusetts
Census-designated places in Massachusetts
Populated coastal places in Massachusetts